Don Rickles (1926–2017) was an American actor, author, and stand-up comedian. The following are his roles in film, television and video games.

Film

Television

Video games

Live shows
 Toy Story: The Musical – Mr. Potato Head (voice)

Theme park attractions
 The Enchanted Tiki Room (Under New Management) - William
 Toy Story Midway Mania! – Mr. Potato Head

References

External links
 
 
 
 Don Rickles at TVGuide.com

American filmographies
Male actor filmographies